The Jacobus House is located in Cedar Grove, Essex County, New Jersey, United States. The house was built in 1725 and was added to the National Register of Historic Places on April 1, 1975.

See also
National Register of Historic Places listings in Essex County, New Jersey

References

Houses on the National Register of Historic Places in New Jersey
Houses completed in 1725
Houses in Essex County, New Jersey
National Register of Historic Places in Essex County, New Jersey
1725 establishments in New Jersey
New Jersey Register of Historic Places
Cedar Grove, New Jersey